Paesaggio Urbano - Urban Design is a bimonthly magazine focusing on architecture and urban design, founded in 1989, published by Gruppo Maggioli.
The magazine offers a multi-disciplinary approach on urban phenomena like sociology, urban typology, economics, architecture and local and international cultural trends. The main focus of the magazine is the urban transformation and the analysis of influencing factors that impact on contemporary architecture. Since 2010 the magazine has started its internationalization process offering contents in English as part of its major restyle in 2011.

Every issue include a monographic dossier focusing on specific topics, like colour, building renovation, sustainability and urban design related themes.

Organisation

Editorial board 
 Editor in Chief: Amalia Maggioli
 Director: Marcello Balzani
 Vice Director: Nicola Marzot

Scientific Committee 
Paolo Baldeschi (University of Florence, Architecture)
Lorenzo Berna (University of Perugia, Engineering)
Marco Bini (University of Florence, Architecture)
Ricky Burdett (London School of Economics)
Giovanni Carbonara (University Valle Giulia, Rome, Architecture)
Manuel Gausa (University of Genova, Architecture)
Pierluigi Giordani (University of Padova, Engineering)
Giuseppe Guerrera (University of Palermo, Architecture)
Thomas Herzog (Technische Universität München)
Winy Maas (Technische Universiteit Delft)
Francesco Moschini (Polytechnic University of Bari)
Attilio Petruccioli (Polytechnic University of Bari)
Franco Purini (University Valle Giulia, Rome, Architecture)
Carlo Quintelli (University of Parma, Architecture)
Alfred Rütten (Friedrich Alexander Universität Erlangen-Nürnberg)
Livio Sacchi (University of Chieti-Pescara, Architecture)
Pino Scaglione (University of Trento, Engineering)
Giuseppe Strappa (University Valle Giulia, Rome, Architecture)
Kimmo Suomi (University of Jyväskylä)
Francesco Taormina (University Tor Vergata, Rome, Engineering)

Web Site and the Vimeo Channel 
The magazine went online and created a web site to make its archive available to a wider audience. The website is constantly updated with the latest issues.
Issues released before 2010 present magazines' covers and the complete table of contents. Issues published from 2011 presents English abstracts of all articles and an English version of the main articles.
Since 2012 the magazine launched a Vimeo channel offering a number of videos and documentaries which complete the èrinted articles and provide more insights on the leading topics.

See also
 Gruppo Maggioli

References

  Paesaggio Urbano boards and info
  Direzione Generale per i Beni Storici e Paesaggistici
  progettarepertutti.org

External links
 The official website

1989 establishments in Italy
Architecture magazines
Design magazines
Magazines published in Italy
Italian-language magazines
Magazines established in 1989
Bi-monthly magazines published in Italy